Schistura implicata is a species of ray-finned fish in the stone loach genus Schistura. It occurs in streams with gravel or stony beds and a moderate to fast current in north eastern Laos and probably also in central Vietnam.

References 

I
Fish described in 2000